The  is the corporate headquarters for Sompo Japan Insurance. It is located in the district Nishi-Shinjuku in Shinjuku, Tokyo, Japan. At 200 metres (656 ft), the building is the 28th tallest building in Tokyo and the 33rd tallest in Japan. It was designed by Yoshikazu Uchida.

On the street level is Seiji Togo Memorial Sompo Japan Museum of Art, where one  of Vincent van Gogh's "Sunflowers" series of paintings is located.

The building is similar in appearance to Chase Tower. The building made an appearance in the 1984 film The Return of Godzilla.

External links

www.tokyoarchitecture.info
 one of the Japanese agents (TOT)
 Description on architecture website
 Seiji Togo Memorial Sompo Japan Museum of Art

Office buildings completed in 1976
Skyscrapers in Shinjuku
Art museums and galleries in Tokyo
Shimizu Corporation
Skyscraper office buildings in Tokyo